Owls Head is an inhabited island in St. Margarets Bay, Nova Scotia. Connected to the mainland by a small bridge, it forms part of the community of Southwest Cove.

References

Islands of St. Margarets Bay, Nova Scotia